Mall of Indonesia (also called MOI) is a shopping center located in Kelapa Gading Square, located on West Kelapa Gading street, Kelapa Gading, North Jakarta, Indonesia. The mall is located right in front of Kelapa Gading Square. This mall was built by The Agung Sedayu Group. Several major anchor stores can be found in the mall, including  Carrefour, Centro Department Store and CGV Cinemas (formerly BlitzMegaplex).

The construction of this mall began in 2003 and was initially aimed to be completed in 2006. However, it was only completed in 2008, precisely in September 2008. Previously, the Carrefour supermarket was present in 2006 and followed by BlitzMegaplex which opened its third branch in Jakarta and the only BlitzMegaplex available in Kelapa Gading. Centro Department Store opened on September 5, 2008 completing the anchor-anchor that has been present. New anchors that have been present include Moiland and Fun World. Beginning in November 2008, MOI opened Food Park which has the mall's main food court.

In 2019, Centro Department Store was replaced by Uniqlo, while CGV Cinemas was replaced by FLIX Cinema, a flagship cinema that owned by Agung Sedayu Group.

Shopping malls in Jakarta
Shopping malls established in 2008
North Jakarta